The 2010 WAC men's basketball tournament was held at the Lawlor Events Center in Reno, Nevada from March 11 through March 13, 2010.  The winner of the tournament was New Mexico State, who received an automatic bid to the 2010 NCAA Men's Division I Basketball Tournament and was crowned the Western Athletic Conference champion.

Format 
Seeding for the tournament was based on the standings from the regular season.  The top eight teams qualified.  In past years all nine teams qualified and the # 8 and # 9 teams would play an opening round game where the winner would play the # 1 seed. However, for 2010 the opening round game was eliminated.

Two quarterfinal games were broadcast on ESPNU. One semifinal and the championship game were broadcast on ESPN2.

Bracket 

Asterisk denotes game ended in overtime.

References

External links 
 Official Western Athletic Conference Website

Tournament
WAC men's basketball tournament
WAC men's basketball tournament
WAC men's basketball tournament